Aboul-Qacem Echebbi (24 February 1909 – 9 October 1934) was a Tunisian poet. He is probably best known for writing the final two verses of the current National Anthem of Tunisia, Humat al-Hima (Defenders of the Homeland), which was originally written by the Egyptian poet Mustafa Sadik el-Rafii.

Life
Echebbi was born in Tozeur, Tunisia, on 24 February 1909, the son of a judge. He obtained his attatoui diploma (the equivalent of the baccalauréat) in 1928. In 1930, he obtained a law diploma from the University of Ez-Zitouna. The same year, he married and subsequently had two sons, Mohamed Sadok, who became a colonel in the Tunisian army, and Jelal, who later became an engineer.

He was very interested in modern literature in particular, and translated romantic literature, as well as old Arab literature. His poetic talent manifested itself at an early age and this poetry covered numerous topics, from the description of nature to patriotism. His poems appeared in the most prestigious Tunisian and Middle-Eastern reviews. His poem To the tyrants of the world became a popular slogan chant during the 2011 Tunisian and subsequently Egyptian demonstrations.

Echebbi died on 9 October 1934 at the current Habib-Thameur Hospital in Tunis, (formerly "Italian Hospital"), following a long history of cardiac disorders (Myocarditis). His portrait is on the current 10 DT note. Echebbi was considered by later Egyptian literary critic Shawqi Daif to be among the very finest Arabic poets of the modern era.

In late 2010 and 2011, Echebbi's poems became a source of inspiration for Arab protestors during the revolutions of the Arab Spring, which began with the Jasmine revolution in Tunisia. Since then, there has been a revived interest in his work and his biography.

Echabbi was buried in hometown Tozeur, Tunisia. His mausoleum is opened for visitors where they can visit his tomb.

Works
 Ilā Ṭuġāt al-Ɛālam (To the tyrants of the world)
 Aġānī al-Ḥayāt (canticles of the life)
 Muđakkarāt (Memories)
 Rasā'il (A collection of letters)
 Ṣadīqī (A collection of seminars given to the Alumni Association of the college; caused quite a lot of controversy among conservative literary groups)

See also
 Al-Tijani Yusuf Bashir, a Sudanese contemporary of Echebbi who also died at the age of 25

References

External links

  Aboul-Qacem Echebbi Website 
  Website

20th-century Tunisian poets
1909 births
1934 deaths
National anthem writers
University of Ez-Zitouna alumni
20th-century poets
People from Tozeur